Dame Ellen Mary Musson, DBE (11 August 1867 – 7 November 1960) was Chair of the General Nursing Council for England and Wales. Her nursing career began in 1898. She served prominently at St Bartholomew's Hospital, West Smithfield, London.

She was raised in Clitheroe, Lancashire. Her father, William Edward Musson, was a surgeon, trained at St Thomas' Hospital. She decided, aged 27, to train as a nurse. She started her training on 1 February 1895 at St Bartholomew's Hospital, London. She retired in February 1923. Half of her tenure had been spent at Birmingham General Hospital. She spent the next two decades working to improve the status of nursing with the College of Nursing and the General Nursing Council.

TFNS
Musson joined the Territorial Force Nursing Service (TFNS) when it was established in 1908, and served as Principal Matron from 1915-18. The TFNS was the nursing wing of the Territorial Army, it consisted of civilian nurses who would provide a reserve of trained nurses for the army, in the event of war. Under the organisation of the TFNS, the country was divided into six regions, and Musson was appointed one of the two matrons for the Birmingham Region. Like other matrons in the TFNS, she encouraged her nurses to join.

Royal College of Nursing
Ellen Musson was a founder member of the Royal College of Nursing, and served as a Council Member from 1916–39; as Honorary Treasurer from 1938–50; as Vice-President from 1950–60; and as Chairman of the General Nursing Council from 1926-44.

Honours
 In 1932, Musson received an Honorary LL.D from the University of Leeds 
 In 1939, Musson was named DBE 
 In 1939, Musson was awarded the International Florence Nightingale Medal, a medal awarded by the International Red Cross Society every two years for outstanding service to the nursing profession

Death
Dame Ellen Musson died in Eastbourne, Sussex on 7 November 1960, aged 93.

References

External links
Profile, hastingspress.co.uk
Reference, Royal College of Nursing (RCN) website

1867 births
1960 deaths
British nursing administrators
Dames Commander of the Order of the British Empire
People from Clitheroe
People from Eastbourne
Florence Nightingale Medal recipients